Mast Bandi (also Romanized as Māst Bandī) is a village in Olya Rural District, in the Central District of Ardestan County, Isfahan Province, Iran. At the 2006 census, its population was 90, in 30 families.

References 

Populated places in Ardestan County